Shane Anthony Lindsay (born 25 January 1985) is an Australian former professional baseball pitcher.

Baseball career

Colorado Rockies
Lindsay was signed as an international free agent by the Colorado Rockies in 2003. He made his Minor League debut in 2004, and spent 2005 and 2006 with the Casper Rockies, Tri-City Dust Devils, and the Asheville Tourists. He missed the entire 2007 season after having surgery on his right shoulder and then spent the 2008 season with two teams, playing for the Tourists and the Modesto Nuts, going 2–3 in 10 games in Modesto.

New York Yankees/Cleveland Indians
On 14 May 2010, Lindsay was claimed off of waivers by the New York Yankees and placed on the 40-man roster. He was designated for assignment 12 days later to make room for Chad Gaudin on the 25-man roster. On 1 June 2010, Lindsay was claimed off waivers by the Cleveland Indians and assigned to the Double-A Akron Aeros.  He played in 12 games with Akron and 7 with the AAA Columbus Clippers.

Chicago White Sox
On 9 January 2011, Lindsay was signed to a minor league contract by the Chicago White Sox. He played in 5 games with the Birmingham Barons and 45 with the Charlotte Knights. He was 3–3 with a 2.18 ERA with the two teams combined.

Lindsay made his Major League debut on 2 September 2011 against the Detroit Tigers, pitching one scoreless inning of relief. He appeared in 4 games for the White Sox, with an ERA of 12.00. He was outrighted to the minors after the season and chose to become a free agent.

Melbourne Aces
In the offseason in both 2010 and 2011 Lindsay pitched for the Melbourne Aces in the Australian Baseball League. Primarily a reliever in the minor leagues, he became a starter in the Australian league.

Los Angeles Dodgers
He signed a minor league contract with the Los Angeles Dodgers in November 2011 and was assigned to the AAA Albuquerque Isotopes. Lindsay pitched in 8 games for the Isotopes, with an 0–1 record and a 5.00 ERA. He also walked 12 batters in only 9 innings of work. The Dodgers released him on 22 May 2012.

Chicago Cubs
He subsequently signed a minor league contract with the Chicago Cubs on 31 May. On 15 June Lindsay was released by the Chicago Cubs.

Return To Chicago White Sox
On 30 June the Chicago White Sox signed Lindsay to a minor league deal.

Return To Melbourne
After not pitching professionally for more than 2 years, Lindsay pitched for the Aces in 2015 and for a few appearances in 2016.

References

External links

1985 births
Living people
Sportspeople from Melbourne
Casper Rockies players
Tri-City Dust Devils players
Asheville Tourists players
Modesto Nuts players
Tulsa Drillers players
Akron Aeros players
Columbus Clippers players
Colorado Springs Sky Sox players
Birmingham Barons players
Charlotte Knights players
Melbourne Aces players
Albuquerque Isotopes players
Iowa Cubs players
Arizona League Cubs players
Chicago White Sox players
2013 World Baseball Classic players
Major League Baseball players from Australia
Waikiki Beach Boys players
Leones del Escogido players
Australian expatriate baseball players in the Dominican Republic
Phoenix Desert Dogs players